The music of the nomadic and rural Turkmen people is closely related to Kyrgyz and Kazakh folk forms. Important musical traditions in Turkmen music include traveling singers and shamans called bakshy, who act as healers and magicians and sing either a cappella or with instruments such as the two-stringed lute called dutar.

Turkmenistan's national poet is Magtumguly Pyragy, from the 18th century, who wrote four-line goshuk lyrics. The Central Asian classical music tradition mugam is also present in Turkmenistan by name as the mukamlar .

National anthem

As a Soviet Republic, Turkmenistan's national anthem was "Turkmenistan", composed by Veli Mukhatov with words by Aman Kekilov. In 1997 (well after independence), the anthem was changed to the "National anthem of Independent, Neutral, Turkmenistan", the music and lyrics of which were written by President-for-Life Saparmurat Niyazov.

Dutar

The dutar is the most representative instrument of Turkmen folk music. It is used in many styles, ranging from the mukamlar and saltıklar to the kirklar and navoi. These are performed by professional musicians called sazanda.

Tuiduk

Tuiduk is a wind instrument (similar to Zurna). Turkmen say that Adam who was moulded from clay had no soul. It was only due to the melodious tuiduk playing Archangel Gabriel could breathe life into him. According to a Turkmen legend the main role in tuiduk invention was played by the devil. There is a ritual of inviting guests for a celebration which has survived from ancient times. Two tuiduk players stand in front each other, point their instruments upwards and play in unison. While doing this they perform magic circular movements which remind that this ritual used to be linked to shamanism.

Dili tuiduk

The Dili tuiduk is a Turkmen woodwind instrument.  It is a clarinet-like, single-reed instrument used mainly in Turkmen folk music. 
The instrument's range is greater than its six finger holes would suggest, the upper registers being attained by breath control.
Dili tuiduk of the Turkmen can be carved in a couple of minutes by a shepherd in the springtime, when reeds grow tall, but a set of brass instruments for a police band needs an investment of money and time to arrive in town.

Gargy tuiduk

Gargy-tuyduk this is a long reed flute whose origin, according to legend, is connected with Alexander of Macedonia, and a similar instrument existed in ancient Egypt.  Gargy means in the Turkmen language "reed".

Bakshy

Bakshy were formerly the most important musicians in Turkmen society, along with tuidukists. They played the dutar to celebrate weddings, births, and other events.

Mugam

Mugam is a pan-Central Asian style of classical music, performed in Turkmenistan by a dutarist and gidjakist, or by an ensemble of just dutarists .

References
Broughton, Simon and Sultanova, Razia. "Bards of the Golden Road". 2000. In Broughton, Simon and Ellingham, Mark with McConnachie, James and Duane, Orla (Ed.), World Music, Vol. 2: Latin & North America, Caribbean, India, Asia and Pacific, pp 24–31. Rough Guides Ltd, Penguin Books.

External links
BBC Radio 3 Audio (105 minutes): Turkmenistan – Christmas in Ashgabat. Accessed 25 November 2010.
Listen and watch Turkmen music and videos. Singers from Turkmenistan.
Photos of Turkmen musical history
Turkmen music site
Bar mi?
Küşt depti

 
Turkmenistan